Gooey butter cake is a type of cake traditionally made in St. Louis, Missouri. It is a flat and dense cake made with wheat cake flour, butter, sugar, and eggs, typically near an inch tall, and dusted with powdered sugar. While sweet and rich, it is somewhat firm, and is able to be cut into pieces similarly to a brownie. Gooey butter cake is generally served as a type of coffee cake and not as a formal dessert cake. There are two distinct variants of the cake: the original St. Louis, MO Bakers' gooey butter and a cream cheese and commercial yellow cake mix variant. The original St. Louis, MO Bakers' gooey butter is believed to have originated in the 1930s.  It was made with a yeast-raised sweet dough on the bottom.

The St. Louis Convention & Visitors Commission includes a recipe for the cream cheese and commercial yellow cake mix variant cake on its website, calling it "one of St. Louis' popular, quirky foods". The recipe calls for a bottom layer of butter and yellow cake batter, and a top layer made from eggs, cream cheese, and, in one case, almond extract. The cake is dusted with confectioner's sugar before being served. The cake is best eaten soon after baking it. It should be served at room temperature or warm.

The cream cheese variant of the gooey butter cake recipe (also known as "Ooey Gooey butter cake", occasionally "chess cake"), while close enough to the original, is an approximation designed for easier preparation at home. Bakeries in the greater St. Louis area who know how to make an original formula Gooey Butter cake, including those at local grocery chains Schnucks and Dierbergs, use a slightly different recipe based on corn syrup, sugar and powdered eggs; however, no cake mix or cream cheese is involved.

Origin and popularity 
There are several claims to the creation of the cake. The cake was supposedly first made by accident in the 1930s by a St. Louis-area German American baker who was trying to make regular cake batter but reversed the proportions of butter and flour. John Hoffman was the owner of the bakery where the mistake was made. One story is that there were two types of butter "smears" used in his bakery: a gooey butter and a deep butter. The deep butter was used for deep butter coffee cakes. The gooey butter was used as an adhesive for things like Danish rolls and stollens. The gooey butter was smeared across the surface, then the item was placed in coconut, hazelnuts, peanuts, crumbs or whatever was desired so they would stick to the product. Hoffman hired a new baker who was supposed to make deep butter cakes, but got the butter smears mixed up. The mistake was not caught until after the cakes came out of the proof box. Rather than throw them away, Hoffman went ahead and baked them. This baking mistake was made during the Great Depression, which meant supplies for baking ingredients were low. The new cake sold so well that Hoffman kept baking and selling them and soon, so did the other bakers around St. Louis.

Another St. Louis baker, Fred Heimburger, also remembers the cake coming on the scene in the 1930s, as a slip up that became a popular hit and local acquired taste. He liked it well enough that Heimburger tried to promote gooey butter cake by taking samples of it with him when he traveled out of St. Louis to visit other bakers in their shops. They liked it, but they could not get their customers to buy it. Their reactions tending to regard it as looking too much like a mistake, and "a flat gooey mess". As such, so it remained as a regional favorite for many decades. Other stories surround the cake's creation; none have been historically verified.

Gooey butter cake is also commonly known outside of the St. Louis area as "ooey gooey butter cake", due to its popularization by celebrity chef Paula Deen.

Availability 
Many St. Louis area grocery stores sell fresh or boxed gooey butter cakes. Haas Baking sold a widely distributed, square and packaged version in a box that depicts a colorful, if anachronistic scene of aviator Charles Lindbergh's plane the Spirit of St. Louis flying past downtown St. Louis, the Gateway Arch and the modern cityscape in clouds. Independent or family bakeries make gooey butter cakes, from a time when there were still many neighborhood corner German and Austrian American bakeries in St. Louis, in neighborhoods like Dutchtown, Bevo Mill, and the Tower Grove area, and others. There are now several businesses that specialize in different flavors of gooey butter cake and sell them in coffee shops, or to walk in customers, or by order or shipment.

Panera Bread Company (original name: St. Louis Bread Company) makes a Danish with a gooey butter filling for the St. Louis market. More recently, Walgreens sells wrapped, individual slices of a version of St. Louis gooey butter cake as a snack alongside muffins, brownies, and cookies.

Gooey butter cake is now widely available outside of the St. Louis area, as Walmart has been marketing a version called Paula Deen Baked Goods Original Gooey Butter Cake. While Walmart still sells a gooey butter cake, they dropped the Paula Deen version.

Gooey butter cake ("butter cake") is also widely popular in German-style bakeries throughout the Philadelphia Metropolitan Area, as well as down the Jersey Shore. Wawa has started selling different flavors of individually-wrapped gooey butter cakes.

Modern versions of this confection, originally sold as a breakfast pastry or "coffee cake", have shown up on upscale restaurant menus across the Midwest and even the West coast.

In popular culture 
On the SyFy television series Defiance, Nolan and Rafe discuss gooey butter cake while in Old St. Louis in the episode "Down In the Ground Where the Dead Men Go".  It was featured on an episode of Pizza Masters titled "Leave Me in St. Louis".

See also 
 Butter cake
 Butterkuchen, the yeasted, German coffeecake that is topped with flecks of butter
 Chess pie, a similar dessert in the form of a pie
 Coffee cake
 Kuchen, the German name for cakes, the coffee cake style which may be similar to the base cake that Gooey butter cake developed from
 Philadelphia Butter Cake, a North Philadelphia cake similar to Gooey Butter cake
 Smearcase, a Baltimore cheesecake served in bar form that resembles Gooey Butter Cake
 St. Louis cuisine

References

External links 

  (with recipe)
  Controversy over a television cook laying claim to Gooey butter cake described

Cuisine of St. Louis
Cuisine of the Midwestern United States
American cakes
Butter cakes